The 13th Army was a field army of the Imperial Russian Army during World War I.

The headquarters of the 13th Army was formed on 16 May 1915. The Army served as a link between the Northwestern and Southwestern fronts. When in August 1915, the North-Western Front was split into the Northern and Western Front, the 13th Army was disbanded. Its troops were incorporated into the 3rd Army and the staff took over command of the 12th Army.

The 13th Army fought in the Great Retreat.

Commander 
 12.06.1915 – 20.08.1915 — General of Infantry Vladimir Gorbatovsky.

See also
 List of Russian armies in World War I
 List of Imperial Russian Army formations and units

References

Armies of the Russian Empire
Military units and formations established in 1915
1915 establishments in the Russian Empire
Military units and formations disestablished in 1915